The Hijacking of the Achille Lauro is a 1989 American drama television film written and directed by Robert L. Collins. The film stars Karl Malden, Lee Grant, E. G. Marshall, and Vera Miles. It focuses on the action and emotional impact of the 1985 terrorist incident that took the life of Leon Klinghoffer.

Cast
 Karl Malden as Leon Klinghoffer
 Lee Grant as Marilyn Klinghoffer
 E. G. Marshall as Stanley "Stan" Kubacki
 Vera Miles as Sophie Kubacki
 Christina Pickles as Charlotte
 Susan Lyons as Ruth
 Robert Mammone as Aldo
 Barry Otto as Kevin
 Neva Small as Lisa
 Monica Trapaga as Ilsa
 Phillip Hinton as Captain De Rosa
 Mohab Boctor as Magid Al-Moqui
 Charles Nassif as Bassam Al-Asker
 John Orcsik as Samir Al-Quantari
 Michael Van Schoor as Ahmed Al-Assadi
 Nabil Hakkim as Abbul Abbas
 Brian Harrison as Ambassador Veliotes
 Tony Helou as Ibrahim Abdelatif

Awards and nominations

References

External links
 
 

1989 films
1989 drama films
1989 television films
1980s English-language films
American films based on actual events
Drama films based on actual events
American drama television films
Films about hostage takings
Films about ship hijackings
Films directed by Robert L. Collins
Films set in 1985
Films set in the Mediterranean Sea
Films set on ships
Films shot in Sydney
NBC network original films
New World Pictures films
Television films based on actual events
1980s American films